The Outsider is a 2014 American action crime drama film directed by Brian A. Miller and written by Craig Fairbrass. The film stars Craig Fairbrass, James Caan, Shannon Elizabeth, Jason Patric, Melissa Ordway, and Johnny Messner.

Plot
An investigation of a dead daughter begins when a military contractor Lex Walker (Craig Fairbrass) arrives in Los Angeles and he finds the body is not his daughter's. Lex Walker, a British mercenary battling in Afghanistan who drops everything to hurry to Los Angeles when he is informed that his daughter Samantha, who he has not seen in many years, has been found dead. When he arrives at the morgue to identify the body, he is for some reason unsurprised to discover that it is not hers. So he begins a one-man investigation into her whereabouts, trailed by the suspicious detective (Jason Patric) assigned to the case. He soon makes his way to Samantha's boss, Karl Schuster (James Caan), the millionaire CEO of a high-tech company who offers sympathy but little help. It quickly becomes obvious that Schuster is hiding something, since he displays no hesitation about shooting one of his henchmen to death in his own office. Aided by a sexy barmaid (Shannon Elizabeth) enticed by his offer of a $10,000 finder's fee, the take-no-prisoners Lex sets out getting to the bottom of the mystery, beating up or shooting the myriad human obstacles who get in his way. It all leads to his discovery of a massive identity-theft scheme engineered by Schuster about which Lex's very much alive daughter (Melissa Ordway) has the goods.

Cast
 Craig Fairbrass as Lex Walker
 James Caan as Karl Schuster
 Shannon Elizabeth as Margo
 Jason Patric as Detective Michael Klein
 Tim Fields as Detective Kennedy
 Melissa Ordway as Samantha
 Johnny Messner as Ricky
 William deVry as Nick Miller
 Brittney Alger as Girl 1
 Stephen Conroy as Gunman 1
 Zack Tiegen as Holden
 Garrett Saia as Construction Worker
 William Hayden as Main gunman
 Mark Oliver as Hassellbring
 Chelsea Bruland as Marissa
 Philippe Radelet as Bar Patron
 Mike Sealas as Bruce

Legal action
In July 2014, star Craig Fairbrass and director Brian Miller sued the film's producers, including both their managers, for non-payment of deferred fees.

References

External links
 
 

2014 films
2014 action drama films
2014 crime drama films
American crime action films
American crime drama films
American action thriller films
Films scored by Patrick Savage
Films set in Louisiana
2014 crime action films
2014 action thriller films
2010s English-language films
Films directed by Brian A. Miller
2010s American films